Larry Edwards may refer to:

 Lawrence Edwards (1919–2009), American aerospace engineer
 Larry Edwards (American football) (born 1984), American football linebacker
 Larry Edwards (cricketer) (born 1995), cricketer for the Windward Islands
Larry Edwards (entertainer)
 Larry Edwards, 1995 Ontario provincial election candidate